Marovo is a constituency of the National Parliament of the Solomon Islands. It is held by former Prime Minister Snyder Rini, representing the Association of Independent Members (AIMP).

References

Legislative Assembly of the Solomon Islands constituencies
Solomon Islands parliamentary constituencies